PSAP stands for Persatuan Sepak Bola Aceh Pidie (en: Football Association of Aceh Pidie). PSAP Sigli is an  Indonesian football club based in Sigli, Pidie Regency, Aceh. They play in Liga 3. Their best achievement was to play in Indonesia Super League in 2011–12 season.
Their home venue is Kuta Asan Stadium, which is located in downtown Sigli.

References

External links
 
PSAP Sigli at Liga-Indonesia.co.id

Football clubs in Indonesia
Football clubs in Aceh
Association football clubs established in 1970
1970 establishments in Indonesia